The Shoghaken Folk Ensemble is an Armenian musical group that performs and records Armenian folk and ashugh (troubadour) music. The ensemble was founded in 1991 in Yerevan. It has since performed in various countries, including France (including a 2006 performance at the Théâtre de la Ville in Paris), Germany, Estonia, Russia, and the United Arab Emirates. In the US, they performed at an eighteen-concert 2004 tour and at the 2002 Folklife Festival as part of the Silk Road project organized by Yo-Yo Ma. The ensemble was also featured on the soundtrack to the Atom Egoyan film Ararat. In 2008, Shoghaken gave concerts during their second major tour of the US and Canada; the tour coincided with the release of the ensemble's latest CD, Shoghaken Ensemble: Music From Armenia.

Among its founding members are sibling singers Hasmik Harutyunyan and Aleksan Harutyunyan, and duduk player Gevorg Dabaghyan. Its members play a variety of traditional Armenian instruments, including but not limited to the duduk, the pku, the zurna, the dhol, the kanon, the kamancha, and the shvi.

Members

 Hasmik Harutyunyan: vocals
 Aleksan Harutyunyan: vocals
 Gevorg Dabaghyan: solo duduk, zurna
 Vardan Baghdasaryan: kamancha
 Karine Hovhannisyan: kanon
 Kamo Khachaturian: dhol
 Levon Tevanyan: shvi, tav shvi, blul, pku and parkapzuk
 Grigor Takushyan: dham duduk (drone)
 Tigran Ambaryan: kamancha
 Artur Arakelyan: ud
 Norayr Davtyan: kamancha

Discography

 1995: Music of Armenia
 2002: Armenia Anthology
 2002: Gorani: Traditional Dances of the Armenian Homeland
 2004: Traditional Dances of Armenia
 2004: Armenian Lullabies
 2008: Shoghaken Ensemble: Music From Armenia

References

External links
 Traditional Crossroads
 Road to Armenia

Armenian musical groups